The snaggletooth shark, or fossil shark (Hemipristis elongata), is a species of weasel shark in the family Hemigaleidae, and the only extant member of the genus Hemipristis. It is found in the Indo-West Pacific, including the Red Sea, from southeast Africa to the Philippines, north to China, and south to Australia, at depths from 1 to 130 meters. This shark can be found near the bottom of the water column of coastal areas, but can be found at continental and insular shelves. Its length is up to 240 cm (7.87 ft) . Despite being only vulnerable to extinction, this shark is very rarely seen.

Anatomy

The snaggletooth's coloration is light grey or bronze with no prominent markings. As its name suggests, it has sharp, serrated teeth on the upper jaw and hooked teeth on the bottom jaw. The shape of its body is fusiform, allowing it greater speed in the water.

Reproduction is a special kind of viviparity, called placental viviparity, where the shark carries its live young in a placenta-like structure, complete with umbilical cord. The structure is derived from the wall of the embryonic yolk sac that has fused with the uterine wall.

Food

The snaggletooth shark preys on a variety of different animals, including bony fish, other sharks, rays, crabs, and cephalopods.

Commercial uses

This shark is usually caught by fishing trawlers (a type of fishing boat), or by gill nets. Fins are used in the shark fin soup trade in China and other Asian countries. The meat is sold for consumption, the liver is used as a  source for vitamins and the rest of the carcass is processed into fish meal.

References

Hemipristis
Fish of the Pacific Ocean
Fish of the Red Sea
Marine fish of Africa
Marine fish of Asia
Marine fauna of Oceania
Fish of Southeast Asia
Vulnerable fish
Vulnerable biota of Africa
Vulnerable fauna of Asia
Vulnerable fauna of Oceania
Fish described in 1871